Greenlaw Moor is an area of raised heather moorland in the foothills of the Lammermuir Hills, in the Scottish Borders area of Scotland. Located north of the town of Greenlaw and with an area of 248 hectares, the moor has been protected as a Ramsar Site since 1996.

This site consists of two small freshwater pools set within an area of heather moorland. It supports an  internationally important population of pink-footed geese, with 3.5% of the population passing through in the spring and autumn.

As well as being recognised as a wetland of international importance under the Ramsar Convention, Greenlaw Moor has also been designated a Special Protection Area and a Site of Special Scientific Interest. The SSSI designation has been in place since 1987, and covers a wider area, a total of 1,172 hectares.

References

Ramsar sites in Scotland
Sites of Special Scientific Interest in Berwickshire and Roxburgh
Wetlands of Scotland